Shizuka Kudo 20th Anniversary the Best is the eleventh compilation album by Japanese singer Shizuka Kudo. It was released in celebration of Kudo's 20th anniversary since her solo debut on August 29, 2007, through Pony Canyon. The compilation includes a selection of Kudo's singles released up until "Amayo no Tsuki ni". The limited edition comes with a DVD featuring the music videos for "Lotus (Umareshi Hana)", "Kokoro no Chikara", "Clāvis (Kagi)" and "Amayo no Tsuki ni", as well as a digest of Kudo's live performances. Shizuka Kudo 20th Anniversary the Best was the first of three releases to celebrate Kudo's 20th, it was followed by the video album box set Shizuka Kudo The Live DVD Complete Box in September 2007, and the B-side compilation, "20th Anniversary B-side collection" in 2008.

Background
Shizuka Kudo 20th Anniversary the Best is a compilation album that features twenty-nine out of forty of Kudo's A-sides released since her solo debut single "Kindan no Telepathy", all the way up to "Amayo no Tsuki ni". The tracks are spread out over two discs. The second disc includes three bonus tracks: a cover of "Manjūshaka", originally sung by Momoe Yamaguchi, as well as self-cover recordings of Kudo's chart-topping "Koi Hitoyo" and the signature ballad "Mechakucha ni Naite Shimaitai".

Commercial performance
Shizuka Kudo 20th Anniversary the Best debuted at number 25 on the Oricon Albums Chart, with 7,000 units sold. The album charted in the top 300 for a total of seven weeks, selling a reported 19,000 copies during its chart run.

Track listing

Charts

References

External links
 Shizuka Kudo 20th Anniversary the Best on Pony Canyon's official website

2007 compilation albums
Shizuka Kudo albums
Pony Canyon compilation albums